Sara Falotico (born 28 June 1984) is an Italian-Belgian figure skater. Competing for Belgium until 2006, she became a three-time Belgian national champion (2002, 2004, and 2005) and reached the free skate at six ISU Championships. In 2014, she began competing for Italy.

Career
Falotico represented Belgium at the World Championships three times, achieving her highest placement (25th) in 2003; four times at the European Championships, with a highest placement of 21st in 2004; and four times at the World Junior Championships, with a highest placement of 21st in 2002 and 2003.

Falotico appeared at the 2005 Karl Schäfer Memorial, the final qualifying competition for the 2006 Winter Olympics, but her result, 8th, was insufficient to earn a spot at the Olympics. She did not compete in the following seasons.

Falotico returned to competition in the 2014–15 season, training at A.s.d. Sesto Ice Skate and representing Italy internationally. She won the 2014 Open d'Andorra and finished 6th at the Italian Championships.

Programs

Competitive highlights
CS: Challenger Series; JGP: Junior Grand Prix

References

External links
 

1984 births
Living people
People from Seraing
Belgian female single skaters
Italian female single skaters
Sportspeople from Liège Province